Pattadakal, formerly known as Raktapura, is a small town in the Bagalkot district of north Karnataka, India. It is famous for its UNESCO world heritage site.

Pattadakal region was settled in pre-historic times, as evidence by megalithic dolmens. Located along the Malprabha river where it turns north, its red color soil and stone mountains nearby attracted its mention in ancient and medieval era Indian texts. The modern town contains the 7th and 8th century collection of nine Hindu and one Jain temple built by the Chalukya dynasty. It is considered by UNESCO as the masterpiece of architectural forms from northern and southern India, that made the town and nearby region as the cradle of temple architecture and arts.

The town is spread over 14.56 square kilometers, at an altitude of 593 meters. The summer (April–June) temperatures peak over 40 C, monsoons typically arrive by mid June. Pattadakal and neighboring villages constitute the Bagalkot taluk whose combined population was 173,181 according to the official 2011 census.

See also
Badami
Badami cave temples

References

Bibliography
 
 

Cities and towns in Bagalkot district
Former capital cities in India
Tourism in Karnataka